Empire of Dirt: The Aesthetics and Rituals of British Indie Music is a 2006 book by Wendy Fonarow.

Contents
The title of the book comes from one verse from the song "Hurt" by Nine Inch Nails ("and you could have it all, my empire of dirt"). Fonarow was given a vinyl edition of the Cash album American IV by Alan McGee, founder of Creation Records while writing the manuscript.

The cover, designed by Matthew Cooper, depicts a typical indie band (2 guitarists, a bass player and a drummer all thin) in silhouette (see sleeperbloke).

In chapter 1 the author discuss 'What Is "Indie"?'. A problem with defining indie is that any precise definition will exclude music and performers which indie fans and insiders feel should be included or include ones that should be excluded.  These are some possible definitions:
 Indie music is the one which is recorded by independent labels and distributed via independent distributors. Records distributed via independent distributors qualified for the UK Indie Chart.
 a genre of music with a distinctive sound and style.
 music that communicates a particular ethos.
 a category of critical assessment.
 music different from other genres like mainstream pop, dance, blues, country or classical.

Reviews

References

External links
 

2006 non-fiction books
Indie music
Books about pop music